Meik Kevin Minnerop is a Grand Prix motorcycle racer from Germany.

Career statistics

By season

Races by year
(key)

References

External links
 Profile on motogp.com
 Profile on SpeedWeek.com
 IDM Statistic

1990 births
Living people
Sportspeople from Siegen
German motorcycle racers
250cc World Championship riders